Leicestershire is a county in the East Midlands of England. Leicester City Council is a unitary authority, and the rest of the county is administered by Leicestershire County Council at the top level, with seven district councils in the second tier, Blaby, Charnwood, Harborough, Hinckley and Bosworth, Melton, North West Leicestershire and Oadby and Wigston.

Local nature reserves (LNRs) are designated by local authorities under the National Parks and Access to the Countryside Act 1949. The local authority must have a legal control over the site, by owning or leasing it or having an agreement with the owner. LNRs are sites which have a special local interest either biologically or geologically, and local authorities have a duty to care for them. They can apply local bye-laws to manage and protect LNRs.

As of December 2017, there are 23 local nature reserves in the county. All sites are open to the public, apart from Knighton Spinney, which is only accessible on occasional open days.

Key

Other classifications
 LRWT = Leicestershire and Rutland Wildlife Trust
 SSSI = Site of Special Scientific Interest

Sites

See also
List of Sites of Special Scientific Interest in Leicestershire
Leicestershire and Rutland Wildlife Trust

Notes

References

 
Leicestershire
Leicestershire-related lists